Benzododecinium bromide (systematic name dimethyldodecylbenzylammonium bromide) is a quaternary ammonium compound used as antiseptic and disinfectant (phenol coefficient is 20-30). It is highly soluble in water and has properties of cationic surfactant.

Benzododecinium bromide is effective against gram-positive microbes. In lower concentrations, its activity against conditionally gram-negative microorganisms (such as Proteus, Pseudomonas, Clostridium tetani etc.) is uncertain. It is not effective against Mycobacterium tuberculosis and bacterial spores. Longer expositions may inactivate some viruses.

Benzododecinium bromide is an active ingredient in the trademarked antiseptic product Ajatin produced in the Czech Republic. In place of bromide, the benzododecinium cation may be used with chloride or another anion.

See also
Carbethopendecinium bromide

References

Quaternary ammonium compounds
Disinfectants
Antiseptics
Bromides
Benzyl compounds
Cationic surfactants